Chérie 25 is a French TV channel, controlled by the NRJ Group. Chérie 25 is launched on TNT, satellite, and xDSL on 12 December 2012. The channel is named after the radio station Chérie FM, owned by the same group.

History
In 2011, Jean-Paul Baudecroux, president of NRJ Group, proposed a television project to launch a new channel named Chérie HD.

In 2012, following the shutdown of analogue television, the Conseil supérieur de l'audiovisuel (CSA) auditioned the NRJ Group following its application for an additional channel from one of the six national HD channels on TNT, and finally had chosen for Chérie HD.

In October 2012, two months before the station was launched, the name Chérie HD was changed to Chérie 25, with 25 referring to the channel's number on the French digital terrestrial television (TNT).

Programmes
 10 ans de moins
 99% plaisir
 Ma vie de femme criminelle
 Ma vie de femme d'ailleurs
 Ma vie de femme intime 
 Ma vie de femme enceinte
 Real Housewives of Beverly Hills
 Sans tabou, 
 Si vous voulez mon avis
 Tout le plaisir est pour moi
 La nouvelle vie de Tori Spelling

TV Series
 Blood Ties
 Bomb Girls
 Dos au mur
 Hot in Cleveland
 La Vie secrète d'une ado ordinaire
 Melrose Place
 Orgueil et Préjugés
 Pacific Homicide
 Roxane ou la Vie Sexuelle de ma Pote
 Rookie Blue
 Royal Pains
 The Middle
 The Tudors
 Titanic: Blood and Steel
 The X-Files

See also
List of television stations in France

References

External links
  Official site

Television channels and stations established in 2012
2012 establishments in France
French-language television stations
Television stations in France